Van de Walle is a Dutch language toponymic surname of Flemish origin, meaning "from the river embankment, quay, or rampart". In West Flanders the name is more common in concatenated forms like Vande Walle and VandeWalle. In the Netherlands the form Van der Wal is most common.

List
People with this name include:

Adelbert Van de Walle (1922–2006), Belgian architect, art historian and professor
Chris G. Van de Walle, Belgian/American material scientist and electrical engineer
Domingo Van de Walle de Cervellón (1720-1776), Spanish explorer and military commander 
Eduard Van De Walle (born 1932), Belgian singer known as Eddy Wally
Geert Van de Walle (1964–1988), Belgian road cyclist
Gerald W. VandeWalle (born 1933), American Chief Justice of the North Dakota Supreme Court
Johan Vandewalle (born 1960), Belgian philologist and civil engineer.
Jurgen Van De Walle (born 1977), Belgian road cyclist
Kristof Vandewalle (born 1985), Belgian road cyclist
Philippe Vande Walle (born 1961), Belgian footballer
Robert Van de Walle (born 1954), Belgian Olympic judoka
Walter van de Walle (1922–2011), Canadian politician
Willy Vande Walle (born 1949), Belgian academic, author, sinologist and Japanologist
Yves Vandewalle (born 1950), French member of the National Assembly of France

See also
 Van der Wal
 Walle (name)

Dutch-language surnames
Surnames of Belgian origin
Surnames of Dutch origin